Karami is an extinct and unclassified Papuan language of southern Papua New Guinea. It is attested from only a short word list, which include many loans from Foia Foia.

Locations
According to Flint (1919: 96), from which the only existing word list of Karami is available, Karami was spoken in the villages of Kikimairi and Aduahai, both located near Daru Station, "on the right-hand side (in the bush) of left branch of the Turama River, Western Division, Papua."

Classification
Although Franklin (1968; 1973: 269-273) classifies Karami as an Inland Gulf language, Usher and Suter (2015: 125) do not consider it to be part of the Anim languages, noting that there are many loanwords from Foia Foia.

Pawley and Hammarström (2018) treat Karami as a 'language isolate', though this is the wording used for languages that are not easily classified.

Vocabulary
Below is the word list of Karami from Flint (1919), which was recorded on October 12, 1917.

{| class="wikitable sortable"
! gloss !! Karami
|-
| sun || aimea
|-
| moon || kuwiri
|-
| star || bube
|-
| wind || urama
|-
| rain || darepu
|-
| night || duruki
|-
| land || borti
|-
| stone || agabu
|-
| hill || darai
|-
| water || auwo
|-
| river || dupa
|-
| fire || mavio
|-
| woman || kipa
|-
| man || sor
|-
| child || kikiwea
|-
| father || tore
|-
| mother || tukini
|-
| wife || kipa
|-
| friend || mabukari
|-
| chief || naramuabera
|-
| sorcerer || adura
|-
| blood || toki
|-
| bone || goni
|-
| skin || kebora
|-
| hair || epurupa
|-
| face || osomi
|-
| ear || kuse
|-
| eye || epegu
|-
| lip || magita
|-
| mouth || magetia
|-
| nose || wodi
|-
| tongue || muta
|-
| neck || dogodi
|-
| tooth || saku
|-
| arm || sibu
|-
| shoulder || binahiwe
|-
| elbow || po
|-
| finger || kimarari
|-
| thumb || tugeti
|-
| finger (1st-4th) || kimarari
|-
| hand || simai-a
|-
| leg || auni
|-
| foot || mea
|-
| belly || niro
|-
| breast || bodoro
|-
| nipple || kino
|-
| navel || dumu
|-
| pig || giromoi
|-
| dog || kso
|-
| wallaby || teberi
|-
| rat || suma
|-
| bird || kaimo
|-
| cassowary || koibo
|-
| fowl || beia
|-
| crocodile || ibirai
|-
| hornbill || kube-i
|-
| snake || wositari
|-
| fish || mini
|-
| louse || sugani
|-
| mosquito || kieono
|-
| forest || gamai-i
|-
| tree || sumari
|-
| sago || asiba
|-
| banana || imara
|-
| sugarcane || amoro
|-
| yam || kusu
|-
| sweet potato || ori
|-
| taro || orpuo
|-
| bamboo || bira
|-
| tobacco || warariga
|-
| village || kuni
|-
| house || ogota
|-
| path || ige
|-
| canoe || gipainoe
|-
| paddle || sitara
|-
| bow || tiri
|-
| arrow || bira
|-
| shield || siwi
|-
| no || wote
|-
| two || kipainoe
|-
| one || botie
|-
| three || kipai-ia
|-
| four || mosokoto
|-
| five || tuporo
|-
| seven || diri
|-
| eight || ma
|-
| nine || ta-o
|-
| ten || taura
|-
| twenty || magagai
|-
| I || torgue
|-
| thou || kuria
|}

References

Unclassified languages of New Guinea
Papuan languages
Languages of Southern Region (Papua New Guinea)